Giresunspor Kulübü is a Turkish professional football club based in Giresun. It was founded in 1925 and re-formed in 1967 after the merger of Yeşiltepespor, Akıngençlikspor, and Beşiktaşspor. The football club is playing in the Turkish Super League. Giresunspor played in the Turkish Super League (Turkish first league) between 1971 and 1977. It was returned to top level after 44 years following defeating Tuzlaspor 2-1 at away match on 9 May 2021.

League history
 Turkish Super League: 1971–1977, 2021–present
 TFF First League: 1967–1971, 1977–78, 1979–1986, 1988–1991, 1993–1995, 1997–2000, 2007–2012, 2014–2021
 TFF Second League: 1978–1979, 1986–1988, 1991–1993, 1995–1997, 2000–2001, 2005–2007, 2012–2014
 TFF Third League: 2001–2005

Players

Current squad

Out on loan

Club Officials

References

External links
Official website
Giresunspor on TFF.org

 
Sport in Giresun
Football clubs in Turkey
Association football clubs established in 1967
1967 establishments in Turkey
Süper Lig clubs